Walnut Grove Township may refer to the following places in the United States:

 Walnut Grove Township, Knox County, Illinois
 Walnut Grove Township, McDonough County, Illinois
 Walnut Grove Township, Neosho County, Kansas, Neosho County, Kansas
 Walnut Grove Township, Greene County, Missouri
 Walnut Grove Township, Knox County, Nebraska
 Walnut Grove Township, Granville County, North Carolina, a township in Granville County, North Carolina
 Walnut Grove Township, Wilkes County, North Carolina, a township in Wilkes County, North Carolina
 Walnut Grove Township, a township in Woods County, Oklahoma
 Walnut Grove Township, Douglas County, South Dakota, a township in Douglas County, South Dakota

See also
Walnut Grove (disambiguation)
Walnut Township (disambiguation)

Township name disambiguation pages